Edgar Priestley Swain (11 April 1881 –  25 July 1949) was the fourth Bishop of Burnley from 1931 until 1950.

Born in Stoke Newington, London, he was the son of banker Harry Edwin Swain and Elizabeth Milsted. He was educated at St John's College, Cambridge and Ripon College Cuddesdon. He was successively Curate of  Holy Trinity with All Souls, Birchfield, Chaplain to the  Bishop of Birmingham, Vicar of Putney and Rural Dean of Barnes before ascending to the Episcopate. A man "whose great gifts marked him out for preferment,"  his scholarship was considered a great asset to the Church in the mid-20th century.

He died in Burnley while in office in 1949.

References

1881 births
Alumni of St John's College, Cambridge
Alumni of Ripon College Cuddesdon
Bishops of Burnley
20th-century Church of England bishops
1949 deaths
Presidents of the Oxford Union